The Bhopal Bharat Teerth Express are the series of "tourist special" trains from Bhopal Junction.

Coach Composite 
1 AC I
2 AC II
3 AC III
1 AC EXECUTIVE CHAIR CAR
1 AC ECONOMY CHAIR CAR
1 PANTRY CAR
8 SLEEPER
1 RESERVED CHAIR CAR
2 GENERAL
1 GENERAL CHAIR CAR
1 ARMED FORCE VAN
1 LADIES SPECIAL COACH
1 PARCEL cum. LUGGAGE

Routes
Bhopal–Jammu Tawi
Bhopal–Trivandrum
Bhopal–Guwahati
Bhopal–Dwarka

Trivia
 The Bhopal Bharat Teerth is the only express train in India with all the category of classes in the rake such as AC, CHAIR CAR, PANTRY etc.

References

Named passenger trains of India
Rail transport in Madhya Pradesh
Pilgrimage in India